Halochroa is a genus of moths of the family Erebidae. The genus was erected by George Hampson in 1926.

Species
Halochroa aequatoria (Mabille, 1879) Ivory Coast, Ghana, Cameroon, Guinea, Zaire, Angola, Ethiopia, Kenya, Uganda, Zambia 
Halochroa eudela D. S. Fletcher, 1963 Zaire, Uganda, Kenya, Malawi, Tanzania, Mozambique, Zimbabwe

References

Calpinae